(Patriotic song), WAB 92, is a patriotic song composed by Anton Bruckner during his stay in Linz.

History 
Bruckner composed this song on a text of August Silberstein in November 1866, during his stay in Linz. He composed it together with the Vaterländisch Weinlied on request of Anton M. Storch.

The work was performed by the Liedertafel Frohsinn on 4 April 1868 in the Redoutensaal of Linz.

The work, of which the original manuscript is lost, was first issued by Doblinger, Vienna in 1902, together with Der Abendhimmel, WAB 56.

The quite large-scaled work (13 pages in the ) is considered one of the best works for men's choir of the Linz period. The song, which remained in the repertoire of Frohsinn, was also performed at the Bruckner-Feier of 1924.

Lyrics

Music 
The 87-bar long work in A-flat major, scored for  choir and tenor and baritone soloists, is in four sections: A (strophes 1 & 2, 21 bars), A (strophes 3 & 4, 21 bars), B (strophes 5 & 6, 20 bars), A (strophes 7 & 8, 21 bars) with a 4-bar coda.

Discography 
There is one recording of the song:
 Reiner E. Moritz, Anton Bruckner - The making of a giant – BR: Arthaus Musik NTSSC, 2021A recording of seven motets, and two Weltliche Chorwerke: Du bist wie eine Blume and Vaterlandslied by Alexander Koller with Hard-Chor-Linz and the Linzer Sängerakademie, is together with the documentary.

References

Sources 
 Anton Bruckner – Sämtliche Werke, Band XXIII/2:  Weltliche Chorwerke (1843–1893), Musikwissenschaftlicher Verlag der Internationalen Bruckner-Gesellschaft, Angela Pachovsky and Anton Reinthaler (Editor), Vienna, 1989
 Cornelis van Zwol, Anton Bruckner 1824–1896 – Leven en werken, uitg. Thoth, Bussum, Netherlands, 2012. 
 Uwe Harten, Anton Bruckner. Ein Handbuch. , Salzburg, 1996. .
 Crawford Howie, Anton Bruckner - A documentary biography, online revised edition

External links 
 
 Vaterlandslied As-Dur, WAB 92 – Critical discography by Hans Roelofs 

Weltliche Chorwerke by Anton Bruckner
1866 compositions
Compositions in A-flat major
German patriotic songs